Costa Rica competed at the 1976 Summer Olympics in Montreal, Quebec,  Canada. Five competitors, four men and one woman, took part in nine events in four sports.

Archery

In its first archery competition at the Olympics, Costa Rica entered two men.  They included the last place finisher.

Men's Individual Competition:
 Juan Wedel — 2165 points (→ 34th place)
 Luis Gonzalez — 2005 points (→ 37th place)

Cycling

One cyclist represented Costa Rica in 1976.

Individual road race
 Carlos Alvarado — did not finish (→ no ranking)

Shooting

One shooter represented Costa Rica in 1976.

50 m rifle, three positions
 Hugo Chamberlain

50 m rifle, prone
 Hugo Chamberlain

Swimming

References

External links
Official Olympic Reports

Nations at the 1976 Summer Olympics
1976 Summer Olympics
1976 in Costa Rica